Bernard Oliver Francis Heywood (1 March 1871March 1960) was a bishop in the Church of England.

Family and education
Heywood was born into a distinguished ecclesiastical family, the sixth son of Henry Robinson Heywood, priest and honorary canon of Manchester Cathedral. Bernard married Marion Maude and they had five sons and two daughters. He was educated at Sunningdale School, then Harrow School and Welldon. He went to Trinity College, Cambridge and graduated in 1892.

Ministry
He was ordained priest in the Church of England in 1895. He was Vicar of St Paul's Church, Bury from 1897 to 1906; Vicar of St Peter's Church, Swinton from 1906 to 1916; and Vicar of Leeds Parish Church from 1916 to 1926. Bishop of Southwell from 1926 to 1928 (before resigning owing to a period of ill health), he was subsequently an Assistant Bishop of York from 1929 to 1931 (during which time he had oversight of the East Riding) and then suffragan Bishop of Hull (effectively the same role) and Archdeacon of the East Riding from 1931 to 1934. From 1934, he was Bishop of Ely, retiring (again in ill health) in 1940/41. From October 1942 to 1951 he was Assistant Bishop of St Albans.

Works
The Bible Day by Day
This is our Faith

References

External links

 

1871 births
1960 deaths
People educated at Sunningdale School
People educated at Harrow School
Alumni of Trinity College, Cambridge
Bishops of Southwell
Bishops of Hull
Bishops of Ely
20th-century Church of England bishops
Archdeacons of the East Riding
Assistant bishops of York
Assistant bishops of St Albans
Bernard